Djingarey Alhassane Maïga (born 17 October 1939), is a Mali-born Nigerien film director and actor. He is best known for the animation works such as Black Barbie. He is also worked as a photographer, assistant director, assistant, camera operator.

Personal life
He was born on 17 October 1939 in Ouatagouna, Mali. After completing education, Maïga moved to Niamey, Niger.

Career
After moving to Niger, he worked as an electricity reader for the energy company "SAFELEC", which later became Compagnie Nigérienne d'Electricité (NIGELEC). In early 1960s, his passion towards cinema arose during the pioneering days of Nigerien film. In 1966, he got the opportunity to play the leading role in the western film Le retour d'un aventurier directed by Moustapha Alassane. After that, Maïga acted in many of Alassane's feature films such as FVVA: Femme, Voiture, Villa, Argent (1972). When the films became popular, Maïga quit from his job at "SAFELEC" in 1971. Then he worked as the assistant director for Moustapha Alassane.

In 1972, Maïga made his first directorial work Le ballon. In the film, his eldest son, who was six at the time, played the leading role. Then in 1976, he directed his maiden feature film L'étoile noire. In this film, Alassane, Damouré Zika and himself also made acting credentials. Several of his films are linked in terms of content as série noire ("black series"). [1] The black that these films have in the title stands for sadness and unhappiness in Africa.

Filmography

References

External links
 

Living people
Nigerien film directors
Malian people
1939 births